Tanybelus is a monotypic genus of South American jumping spiders containing the single species, Tanybelus aeneiceps. It was first described by Eugène Louis Simon in 1902, and is found only in Venezuela and Colombia.

References

Invertebrates of Venezuela
Monotypic Salticidae genera
Salticidae
Spiders of South America